Bolshoye Grigorovo is a rural locality (a village) in Razdolyevskoye Rural Settlement, Kolchuginsky District, Vladimir Oblast, Russia. The population was 4 as of 2010.

Geography 
Bolshoye Grigorovo is located 16 km southeast of Kolchugino (the district's administrative centre) by road. Maloye Grigorovo is the nearest rural locality.

References 

Rural localities in Kolchuginsky District